Ronny Kevin Roldán Velasco (born March 8, 1993) is a Colombian singer.

Biography 
Ronny Kevin Roldán Velasco spent his childhood in Cali, Colombia where he started to pursue a musical career since he was 13 years old. He produced his first songs and experimented with reggaeton beats.
  
Roldán's earliest song was "Macatraca" (Contra la Pared), and it was quickly liked by his fellow Colombians.

Roldán then also promoted the song by throwing a party in a large hall where it sold three thousand tickets.

In 2013, Roldán signed a deal with Kapital Music and released his first song "Salgamos" with Andy Rivera and Maluma, being featured in the song and rapidly climbed to number 1 on the music charts of Colombia and the song now has over 300 million views on YouTube. The song was also popular in Latin America and Spain which earned it gold.

In 2014, Roldán collaborated with Puerto Rican reggaeton artist Nicky Jam to make "Una Noche Más", which now has over 180 million views YouTube.

Later that year, Roldán also collaborated with fellow Colombian reggaton artist Ronald el Killa to make "Quién Te Va Amar Como Yo", which now has over 130 million views on youtube.

In 2015, Roldán was invited to the birthday party of soccer player Cristiano Ronaldo. In the party he was seen alongside several other famous soccer players from Real Madrid like James Rodríguez, Keylor Navas, and Marcelo. which caused controversy in social media and the sports world. Months later he was mentioned by Gerard Piqué. That same year he released two more singles: "Nadie como Tú" and "Contigo".

In 2016, he signed with the music label Universal Music Latino and recorded several songs such as "Me Matas" with Arcángel. While in Argentina, Roldán met Luciano Clivo, a friend of Puerto Rican rapper Bryant Myers, who suggested that Roldán work with Myers, and they released "¿Por Qué Sigues con Él?" (remix).

More recently associated with De La Ghetto, Mackie, and Ben3detti.

Discography

EPs 
 2015: Kevin Roldán: Special Edition 
 2016: Rich Kid
 2018: Volvió KR
 2019: KRING
 2021: BOFFF

Songs as main artist 
 2010: "Cambiaste Mi Vida" (ft. Crissin)
 2011: "Booty Booty" (Te Ves Bien)
 2011: "Soy Yo"
 2012: "Tú No Sabes"
 2012: "Sensación Sermosa"
 2012: "Chévere"
 2012: "Con Flow Mátalo" (ft. J Balvin, Maluma, Reykon, Dragón & Caballero, Jay & el Punto)
 2013: "Party"
 2013: "Salgamos" (ft. Maluma, Andy Rivera)
 2013: "Inevitable"
 2013: "Party (Remix)" (ft. Nicky Jam)
 2014: "Una Noche Más" (ft. Nicky Jam)
 2014: "Si No Te Enamoras"
 2014: "Hay Mujeres" (ft. Alberto Stylee
 2014: "Cuando Sales Sola"
 2015: "Nadie como Tú" (Eres Mi Droga)
 2015: "Contigo"
 2015: "Me Matas" (ft. Arcángel)
 2015: "De Fiesta" (Remix) (ft. Dayme y El High)
 2016: "Soy La Historia"
 2016: "Aprovéchame"
 2016: "Tú y Yo"
 2016: "Sola"
 2016: "Soltera" (ft. Alexio La Bestia)
 2016: "Una Noche"
 2016: "Ruleta Rusa"
 2016: "Tu Cuerpo" (ft. Falsetto)
 2016: "Me Tienes Loco"
 2017: "Na Na Na"
 2017: "Tranquilo" (ft. Bad Bunny)
 2017: "Me Nace Falta" (ft. Nene La Amenaza)
 2017: "Me Gustas"
 2017: "Eres Mi Todo" (ft. Karol G)
 2017: "Teddy" (ft. Nacho)
 2017: "Una Trampa"
 2018: "PPP"
 2019: "PPP" (ft. Zion & Lennox)
 2019: "Deseos" (ft. Wisin)
 2019: "Hasta Abajo" (ft. Bryant Myers, Lyanno)
 2020: "BB"
 2022: "Bésame" with Omar Montes

References 

1993 births
21st-century Colombian male singers
Colombian reggaeton musicians
Living people
Universal Music Latino artists